Willfred Anak Jabun (born 12 April 1989) is a Malaysian professional footballer who plays as a goalkeeper for PDRM.

References

External links
 

1989 births
Living people
People from Sarawak
Malaysian footballers
Malaysia Super League players
Malaysia Premier League players
PDRM FA players
Association football goalkeepers